This is a list of films set in Vienna. Due to Vienna's rich musical heritage, many of the movies set there are about music or have a strong musical element in the storyline.

List of films 

 360 (film)
 1914 (film)
 Almost Angels
 Amadeus (film)
 The Angel with the Trumpet (1948 film)
 The Angel with the Trumpet (1950 film)
 Angeli senza paradiso
 Anni (film)
 Anton the Last
 Anuschka (film)
 Bad Timing
 Beauty and the Boss
 Beethoven Lives Upstairs
 Beethoven's Great Love
 Before Dawn (film)
 Before Sunrise
 Beloved Augustin (1940 film)
 The Best Offer
 Beware of Pity
 Bitter Sweet (1933 film)
 Bitter Sweet (1940 film)
 Blind Man's Bluff (1936 film)
 Blossom Time (1934 film)
 The Bohemian Dancer (1926 film)
 Bride of the Wind
 Burgtheater (film)
 Calling Philo Vance
 Canaris (film)
 Captain America: Civil War
 Carry On Spying
 Castles in the Air (1939 film)
 Champagne Waltz
 The Chocolate Soldier (film)
 The City Without Jews
 The Climax
 Come to Vienna, I'll Show You Something!
 Congress Dances
 The Congress Dances (1955 film)
 Conquest (1937 film)
 Dancing Vienna
 The Dancing Years (film)
 A Dangerous Method
 They Dare Not Love
 Downstairs (film)
 Dreams Come True (1936 film)
 Emperor Charles (film)
 The Emperor Waltz (1953 film)
 The Emperor Waltz
 Escapade (1935 film)
 Eternal Melodies
 Evenings for Sale
 Exit... nur keine Panik
 Falstaff in Vienna
 The Fate of the House of Habsburg
 Fearless (1978 film)
 The Firebird (1934 film)
 Die Fledermaus (1923 film)
 Die Fledermaus (1946 film)
 Die Fledermaus (1962 film)
 Die Fledermaus (1979 film)
 The Florentine Dagger
 Florian (film)
 Foreign Intrigue (film)
 Forget Mozart
 Four in a Jeep
 Franz Schubert (film)
 Fräulein Else (1929 film)
 Freud: The Secret Passion
 Gently My Songs Entreat
 Goodbye, Mr. Chips (1939 film)
 Goodnight, Vienna
 Grand Duchess Alexandra
 The Great Awakening (film)
 The Great Waltz (1938 film)
 The Greater Glory
 The Guardsman
 Hauptmann Florian von der Mühle
 Heart's Desire (1935 film)
 Her Sister from Paris
 The Higher Command
 Hitler: The Rise of Evil
 The House of Rothschild
 The House of Three Girls (1918 film)
 The House of Three Girls (1958 film)
 I, Don Giovanni
 The Illusionist (2006 film)
 Immortal Waltz
 Invisible Adversaries
 The Iron Duke
 It's Only Love (film)
 Jeannie (film)
 Jewel Robbery
 Johann Mouse
 Joyless Street
 Killer's Carnival
 The King Steps Out
 Kings Row
 The Kiss Before the Mirror
 Klimt (film)
 Kolberg (film)
 Der Kongreß tanzt
 Last Stop (film)
 The Last Waltz King
 Letter from an Unknown Woman (1948 film)
 The Lie of Nina Petrovna
 The Living Daylights
 The Long Shadow (1961 film)
 Love Me and the World Is Mine
 A Love Story (1933 film)
 Malina (film)
 The Man with Two Brains
 Maria Ilona
 Maria Theresa (film)
 Marie Antoinette (1938 film)
 The Marriage Circle
 Maskerade (film)
 Mayerling (1968 film)
 Mayerling (1936 film)
 Mayerling (1957 film)
 Melba (film)
 The Melody Man
 The Merry Wives of Vienna
 Merry-Go-Round (1923 film)
 Mesmer (film)
 Miracle of the White Stallions
 Mission: Impossible – Rogue Nation
 The Mistress (1927 film)
 Money on the Street
 Mozart (1955 film)
 The Murderer with the Silk Scarf
 Museum Hours
 My Daughter Lives in Vienna
 The Mysterious Lady
 Napoleon (1955 film)
 The Night Is Young
 The Night Porter
 The Odessa File (film)
 Once Upon a Honeymoon
 Oh... Rosalinda!!
 One Does Not Play with Love
 Operetta (film)
 The Piano Teacher (film)
 Poor as a Church Mouse
 Die Pratermizzi
 Premiere (1937 film)
 The Red Danube
 Reunion in Vienna
 Das Riesenrad
 La Ronde (1950 film)
 Rush (2013 film)
 Salome, Where She Danced
 Sarajevo (1940 French film)
 School for Love
 Schrammeln
 Schubert's Dream of Spring
 Scorpio (film)
 Le Secret de Mayerling
 The Secret Diary of Sigmund Freud
 Sehnsucht 202
 Sensational Janine
 Serenade (1927 film)
 Serenade (1940 film)
 The Seven-Per-Cent Solution (film)
 Shots in Threequarter Time
 Silva (film)
 The Singing City
 Sisi (miniseries)
 Sissi (film)
 Sissi – The Young Empress
 Sissi – Fateful Years of an Empress
 The Smiling Lieutenant
 So Ends Our Night
 A Song for You (film)
 The Song You Gave Me
 Spring Parade (1934 film)
 Spring Parade
 Stolen Identity (film)
 The Strange Vice of Mrs. Wardh
 Strauss Is Playing Today
 Such Great Foolishness
 Sunshine Susie
 Swelling Melodies
 Tales from the Vienna Woods
 Tales of Old Vienna
 The Third Man
 To Skin a Spy
 To the Bitter End
 Tragedy in the House of Habsburg
 Ultimatum (1938 film)
 Und Jimmy ging zum Regenbogen
 Vienna 1910
 Vienna Blood (film)
 Vienna Tales
 Vienna, City of My Dreams (1957 film)
 Vienna, City of Song
 Vienna, City of Song (1923 film)
 Vienna, How it Cries and Laughs
 Viennese Girls
 Viennese Nights
 The Virtuous Sinner
 Voices of Spring (1933 film)
 A Waltz by Strauss
 A Waltz by Strauss (1925 film)
 A Waltz Dream (film)
 The Waltz King (film)
 Waltz Time (1933 film)
 Waltz Time (1945 film)
 Waltz War
 Waltzes from Vienna
 Watermarks (film)
 We Belong to the Imperial-Royal Infantry Regiment
 The Wedding March (1928 film)
 When Nietzsche Wept
 Whom the Gods Love (1936 film)
Woman In Gold
 A Woman of Experience

See also 

 Lists of Austrian films
 List of films set in Rome

Vienna
Films set in Vienna